Shayang is a county of west-central Hubei province, People's Republic of China. Administratively, it is part of the prefecture-level city of Jingmen. The county is located south of the Jingmen city proper, west of the Han River, and north of the Chang Lake (Chang Hu).

The county seat is a town of the same name, situated near the Han River, which eventually flows into the Yangtze River. To the east of the town is a huge flat region which contains one of the largest prison farm systems in China.

Administrative Divisions

Towns:

Shayang Town, Wulipu, Shilipu, Jishan, Shihuiqiao, Hougang, Maoli, Guandang, Lishi, Maliang, Gaoyang, Shenji, Zengji

Other Areas:
Binjiang New Area, Xingangqu (New Port Area), Shayang Economic Development District, Shayang Prison Management Bureau

References 

Counties of Hubei
Jingmen